Vince Radcliffe (9 June 1945 – 10 March 2014) was an English professional footballer who played as a defender.

Career
Born in Manchester, Radcliffe played in England and Australia for Portsmouth, Peterborough United, Rochdale, King's Lynn and Western Suburbs.

Later life and death
Following a long illness, Radcliffe died in Perth on 10 March 2014, at the age of 68.

References

1945 births
2014 deaths
English footballers
Portsmouth F.C. players
Peterborough United F.C. players
Rochdale A.F.C. players
King's Lynn F.C. players
English Football League players
Association football defenders
English expatriate footballers
English expatriate sportspeople in Australia
Expatriate soccer players in Australia